CKCN-FM Plaisir 94,1 is a French language Canadian radio station that broadcasts a hot adult contemporary format on 94.1 FM in Sept-Îles, Quebec.

Owned by Radio Sept-Îles, the station began operations as an AM station in 1963, broadcasting on 560 kHz, and received CRTC approval to convert to the FM band in 1998.

On October 26, 2012, Médias Nord-Cotiers received CRTC approval to take effective control of CKCN-FM from its previous owner, Radio Sept-Îles.

References

External links
 Official site 
 

Kcn
Kcn
Kcn
Sept-Îles, Quebec
Radio stations established in 1963
1963 establishments in Quebec